The 1979–80 Ranji Trophy was the 46th season of the Ranji Trophy. Delhi retained the title defeating Bombay.

Group stage

North Zone

South Zone

West Zone

Central Zone

East Zone

Knockout stage 

(T) - Advanced to next round by spin of coin.

Final

Scorecards and averages
Cricketarchive

References

External links

1980 in Indian cricket
Domestic cricket competitions in 1979–80
Ranji Trophy seasons